is a Japanese professional baseball pitcher. He was born in Yao, Osaka. He is currently playing for the Chiba Lotte Marines of the NPB.

References

1980 births
Living people
Japanese baseball players
Nippon Professional Baseball pitchers
Hanshin Tigers players
Chiba Lotte Marines players